A Lesson in Love is a 1931 American comedy film starring Helen Kane.

Plot
Helen Kane stars as "Helen Lane", a college student who has a crush on her psychology teacher Professor Hotchiss (or "Professor Hot Kiss" as Helen bumbles). The professor however is short-tempered with Helen because she's such a poor student. She disrupts the classroom, and he kicks her out of the class. However later at the school dance Helen can't get over her feelings for Professor Hotchiss. Helen bumps into the professor and they both confess their love for one another. Helen then begins to sing for the professor "I Love Myself Cause You Love Me."  After her performance the professor proposes to her, and she accepts.

Cast
Helen Kane as Helen Lane
Donald Kirke
Millard Mitchell

External links
 
 

1931 films
1931 comedy films
Paramount Pictures short films
American black-and-white films
American comedy short films
Films directed by Casey Robinson
1930s English-language films
1930s American films